The Alexandra railway line is a closed  branch railway line situated in the Hume region of Victoria, Australia. The line was primarily built to provide a general goods and passenger service to townships in the area.

History
The line was opened in 2 stages from September 1890 to October 1909, and closed in November 1978.

The branch was opened from Cathkin to Koriella station on 16 September 1890, and to the terminus at Alexandra on 28 October 1909.

The branch was closed in 1978, at the same time as the Mansfield line. The rail reserve is now part of the Goulburn River High Country Rail Trail.

The Alexandra Timber Tramway and Museum has occupied the Alexandra station buildings since the 1970s and, since the line was closed, have operated a museum at the station site, dedicated to the timber industry in the local area.

Stations

References

External links
 
   Photographs of stations along the Alexandra line

Closed regional railway lines in Victoria (Australia)
5 ft 3 in gauge railways in Australia
Railway lines opened in 1973
Railway lines closed in 1978
1973 establishments in Australia
1978 disestablishments in Australia
Transport in Hume (region)